El Milagro is a populated place in the Huanchaco district in the La Libertad Region, Peru. It is part of the urban area of Trujillo city. In 2011, local residents had the idea of upgrading the area as a district. Fishing plays a large role in its economy.

Population
According to the 2007 census, the town of El Milagro had an estimated population of 24,625 inhabitants, of whom 12,828 were men and 11,797 were women. The population of El Milagro is relatively young, with 62.86% being under 29 years old.

See also

Trujillo
Historic Centre of Trujillo
Chan Chan
Puerto Chicama
Chimu
Pacasmayo beach
Marcahuamachuco
Wiracochapampa
Moche
Víctor Larco Herrera District
 Vista Alegre
Las Delicias beach
La Libertad Region
Trujillo Province, Peru
Virú culture
Lake Conache
Marinera Festival
Trujillo Spring Festival
Wetlands of Huanchaco
Salaverry
Buenos Aires
San Jose Festival
Puerto Morín

External links

Location of El Milagro (Wikimapia)
"Huaca de la luna and Huaca del sol"
"Huacas del Sol y de la Luna Archaeological Complex", Official Website
Information on El Brujo Archaeological Complex
Chan Chan World Heritage Site, UNESCO
Chan Chan conservation project
Website about Trujillo, Reviews, Events, Business Directory
 http://www.huanchacovivo.com

Multimedia
Gallery of Huanchaco by Panoramio, with information of several authors.
 
 
 
 Gallery pictures by Panoramio, Includes Geographical information by various authors
Colonial Trujillo photos

References

Localities of Trujillo, Peru
Populated places in La Libertad Region